"Isn't It Romantic?" is a 1932 song by Rodgers and Hart.

Isn't It Romantic may also refer to:

Isn't It Romantic? (1948 film), a musical starring Veronica Lake and Billy De Wolfe
Isn't It Romantic (2019 film), a parody romantic comedy starring Rebel Wilson
Isn't It Romantic: The Standards Album, a 2005 album by Johnny Matthis
Isn't It Romantic?, a 2006 album by Sharon Cuneta
"Isn't It Romantic?" (The Golden Girls), a 1986 television episode
"Isn't It Romantic?" (Roseanne), a 1994 television episode